SSSPM J1549-3544 is a star in the constellation Lupus with high proper motion.  It was initially found to have high proper motion in a 2003 survey of images taken by the optical SuperCOSMOS Sky Surveys and by the near-infrared sky surveys 2MASS and DENIS.  It was then thought to be a cool white dwarf close to the Sun.  However, more detailed spectroscopic observations in 2005 appear to show that it is not a white dwarf, but a high-velocity halo metal-poor subdwarf.

References

Lupus (constellation)
K-type subdwarfs